A whiffenpoof is an imaginary animal.

It can also refer to:

 The Whiffenpoofs, a music group at Yale University
 Whiffenpoof Fish, a fictional fish in the operetta Little Nemo
 A stereotypical student at Yale University

See also
Eoörnis pterovelox gobiensis, a fictional bird with the common name Woofen-poof